The 1980 Team Ice Racing World Championship was the second edition of the Team World Championship. The final was held on ?, 1980 in Eindhoven in the Netherlands.

Classification

See also 
 1980 Individual Ice Speedway World Championship
 1980 Speedway World Team Cup in classic speedway
 1980 Individual Speedway World Championship in classic speedway

References 

Ice speedway competitions
World